Meris Skenderović (born 28 March 1998) is a Montenegrin footballer who plays as a forward for TSV 1860 Munich.

References

External links
 
 
Profile - TSG Hoffenheim

1998 births
Living people
Footballers from Mannheim
German people of Montenegrin descent
Association football forwards
German footballers
Germany youth international footballers
Montenegrin footballers
Montenegro under-21 international footballers
TSG 1899 Hoffenheim II players
TSG 1899 Hoffenheim players
TSV Hartberg players
FC Carl Zeiss Jena players
1. FC Schweinfurt 05 players
TSV 1860 Munich players
Regionalliga players
Austrian Football Bundesliga players
3. Liga players
Montenegrin expatriate footballers
Expatriate footballers in Austria
Montenegrin expatriate sportspeople in Austria